Pickapeppa Sauce, also known as Jamaican ketchup, is a brand-name Jamaican condiment, the main product of the Pickapeppa Company, founded in 1921. It is made in Shooters Hill, Jamaica, near Mandeville. The ingredients (in order on the product label) are cane vinegar, sugar, tomatoes, onions, raisins, sea salt, ginger, peppers, garlic, cloves, black pepper, thyme, mangoes, and orange peel, aged in oak barrels. The sauce is sweet, sour and mildly spicy. The company makes several variants of the sauce, including mango and extra-hot Scotch bonnet pepper varieties.

One traditional use of the sauce is to pour it over a block of cream cheese, to be spread on crackers.

A noted fan of Pickapeppa sauce is supermodel Naomi Campbell, who carries a bottle with her.

See also

 Jamaican cuisine
 Lizano sauce, a very similar sauce from Costa Rica

References

External links
 

Hot sauces
Jamaican cuisine
Brand name condiments
1921 establishments in Jamaica
Food and drink companies of Jamaica
Tomato sauces
Brown sauces
Food and drink companies established in 1921
Condiment companies
Jamaican brands